Ted Geoghegan (born August 10, 1979) is an American filmmaker and publicist. He grew up in Great Falls, Montana, attending private and public schools and studying film extensively. He attended The University of Montana in Missoula, Montana and attained a degree in English Education.

Geoghegan is best known for his work in the horror genre. He is also a film publicist.

Filmography

References

External links

1979 births
American male screenwriters
Living people
People from Great Falls, Montana
American fantasy writers
University of Montana alumni
People from Beaverton, Oregon
American male novelists
Writers from Montana
Novelists from Oregon
21st-century American novelists
21st-century American male writers
Screenwriters from Oregon
Screenwriters from Montana
21st-century American screenwriters
Horror film directors